The Mint Spring Marl is a geologic formation in Mississippi. It preserves fossils dating back to the Paleogene period.

See also
 List of fossiliferous stratigraphic units in Mississippi
 Paleontology in Mississippi

References

 

Geologic formations of Mississippi